Roseaux is an alternative French music project put by Emile Omar and includes artists Alex Finkin and Clement Petit. The band was formed in July 2012. The band released its self-titled debut album Roseaux through Fanon / Tôt ou Tard. All eleven tracks on the album feature the vocals of Aloe Blacc including the debut single 
"More Than Material". Both the album and the single charted in SNEP, the official French Singles and Albums Chart.

In September 2019 their second album Roseaux II was released.

Discography

Albums

Singles

References

External links
Facebook
YouTube

French musical groups